Dmitri Mandrîcenco (born 13 May 1997) is a Moldovan professional footballer who plays as a midfielder for the Moldova national team. He is currently under suspended contract with Inhulets Petrove.

Club career
Mandrîcenco was born in Tiraspol, Moldova, and started his youth career with Sheriff Tiraspol. He later played youth football in Ukraine for RVUFK Kyiv, Vorskla Poltava and Dynamo Kyiv. He started his senior career in Moldova, before moving to Georgia and Saburtalo Tbilisi in January 2021. In January 2022, he joined Ukrainian side Inhulets Petrove. On 6 April 2022, Mandrîcenco signed a contract with Motor Lublin.

International career
Having represented Moldova at under-17, under-19 and under-21 level, Mandrîcenco made his senior international debut for the country on 18 January 2022 against Uganda. Starting the match, he scored a goal after just 10 minutes of play.

International goals

Personal life
Mandrîcenco holds both Moldovan and Ukrainian citizenship. He comes from a footballing family; his brother Constantin Mandrîcenco is a footballer, and his father Nicolae Mandrîcenco and his uncle Ivan Mandricenco were also footballers.

Honours
Saburtalo Tbilisi
 Georgian Cup: 2021

Tighina
 Divizia B: 2018

Sfîntul Gheorghe
 Divizia Națională Runners-up: 2019
 Moldovan Cup runner-up: 2018–19, 2019–20

References

External links
 
 

1997 births
Living people
Moldovan people of Ukrainian descent
People from Tiraspol
Piddubny Olympic College alumni
Association football midfielders
Moldovan footballers
Moldova youth international footballers
Moldova under-21 international footballers
Moldova international footballers
FC Dinamo-Auto Tiraspol players
FC Spicul Chișcăreni players
FC Sfîntul Gheorghe players
FC Tighina players
FC Saburtalo Tbilisi players
FC Inhulets Petrove players
Motor Lublin players
Moldovan Super Liga players
Erovnuli Liga players
II liga players
Moldovan expatriate footballers
Expatriate footballers in Georgia (country)
Moldovan expatriate sportspeople in Georgia (country)
Expatriate footballers in Ukraine
Moldovan expatriate sportspeople in Ukraine
Expatriate footballers in Poland
Moldovan expatriate sportspeople in Poland